America Again: Re-becoming The Greatness We Never Weren't is a 2012 satirical book written by Stephen Colbert and other writers of The Colbert Report as a follow-up to 2007's I Am America (And So Can You!). It is published by Grand Central Publishing. The book was released on October 2, 2012. Its audiobook won the 2014 Grammy Award for Best Spoken Word Album, making for Colbert's second Grammy win, as well as his third Grammy nomination overall.

Synopsis
Colbert addresses topics including Wall Street, campaign finance, energy policy, healthcare, eating on the campaign trail, and the United States Constitution.

See also
 America (The Book)
 Earth (The Book)
 I Am America (And So Can You!)
 I Am a Pole (And So Can You!)

References

External links
 The Third-Most Important Book of the Century BY Stephen Colbert

2012 non-fiction books
Political satire books
The Colbert Report
Books by Stephen Colbert
Grand Central Publishing books